Vinzenz is a given name. Notable people with the name include:

Vinzenz Bronzin (1872–1970), professor of mathematics in Trieste, Italy
Vinzenz Dittrich (1890–1965), Austrian football (soccer) player in defender role and manager
Vinzenz Fux (1606–1659), organist of the church Maria am Gestade in Vienna, then joined the chapel of the widowed Empress Eleanora
Vinzenz Maria Gredler (1823–1912), Austrian naturalist
Vinzenz Kaiser, Obersturmbannführer in the Waffen SS during World War II, awarded the Knight's Cross of the Iron Cross
Franz Vinzenz Krommer (1759–1831), Czech composer of classical music
Vinzenz Lachner (1811–1893), German composer and conductor
Carl Alois Johann-Nepomuk Vinzenz, Fuerst Lichnowsky (1761–1814), second Prince Lichnowsky and a Chamberlain at the Imperial Austrian court
Vinzenz Eduard Milde (1777–1853), Prince-Archbishop of Vienna
Vinzenz Schöttl (1905–1946), German Nazi concentration camp SS officer executed for war crimes
Ignaz Vinzenz Zingerle von Summersberg (1825–1892), Austrian poet and scholar
Vinzenz von Wartenberg (1379–1419), commander of the Royalist Bohemian forces at the start of the Hussite Wars

See also
Vinzenz Lausmann Memorial State Natural Area, state park in northern Hood River County, Oregon, USA
Vincenzo
Vinzel

German masculine given names